Acleris literana, the sprinkled rough-wing, is a moth of the family Tortricidae. The species was first described by Carl Linnaeus in his 1758 10th edition of Systema Naturae. It is found in most of Europe and in the Near East.

It is a variable species and many different forms have been described, but all have a combination of blackish and whitish markings on a pale green ground. Julius von Kennel provides a full description.

Adults are on wing from August to September and again from April to May after overwintering as an adult.

The larvae feed on Quercus species. They live between leaves spun together with silk.

References

External links 

 
 Fauna Europaea
 Lepiforum e.V.

literana
Tortricidae of Europe
Moths of Asia
Moths described in 1758
Taxa named by Carl Linnaeus